St. Jean de Brebeuf Catholic High School, also known as SJB, is a Catholic high school located in Woodbridge, Ontario, Canada. Opened in September 2005 to about 600 students, it has since grown to about 1500 enrolled students. The school started with only grades 9 and 10 in the first year it opened. SJB is part of the York District Catholic School Board (YCDSB). St. Jean de Brebeuf has six computer labs, two full size gyms, two full size soccer fields, tennis courts, and a baseball diamond. It has an agreement with the Vellore Village Community Center, which is directly connected to the school, granting students patronage of the full size swimming pool, gym and youth room.

Closed-campus policy (2005-2011)
When the school first opened in September 2005, it had been widely criticized as being the only high school in York Region with a closed-campus policy. This policy forbade students from leaving school property during school hours. This upset students primarily because they were not allowed to leave during the lunch periods to eat lunch food other than the school's cafeteria food - food that was deemed mediocre and over-priced by many students. Violation of the closed-campus policy often resulted in suspension. This policy was so highly enforced that many students claimed former principal Romolo Villani had "sprinted after them" in an attempt to catch and punish them. Student testimonies state that he was successful on many occasions.

In the second semester of the 2010-2011 year, as the York Catholic District School Board had increased their pressure on schools to better enforce their uniform policies, SJB administration had adopted a lax approach to their closed-campus policy to allocate that time into enforcing their now-stricter uniform policy. For the first time since the school's opening, students were seen leaving the campus with little to no objection from teachers and other staff. In September 2011, vice principal Bohdan Lechman had officially announced that the school's closed-campus policy was no longer in effect.

Fire alarm crisis (2022-2023)
St. Jean de Brebeuf and the Vellore Village Community Center frequently report fire alarms occurring for a multitude of reasons, however it is most commonly due to vaping in washrooms. As of March 2023, the school has lost an estimated ~$15,000 CAD, causing a seizure of bathrooms on the second and third floors. This decision has led to the dismay of students currently attending the school, causing frequent bursts of unrest.

Feeder schools
The feeder schools for St. Jean de Brebeuf are:
St. Emily Catholic School
St. Agnes of Assisi Catholic School
St. Veronica Catholic School
St. John Bosco Catholic School
St. Clare Catholic School
St. Michael the Archangel Catholic School
St. Mary of the Angels Catholic School

Dual Feeder schools 

Students in at the following schools have the option to attend Holy Cross, Father Bressani, or St. Jean De Brebeuf.
St. Andrew Catholic School
St. Stephen Catholic School
St. Padre Pio Catholic School
Our Lady of Fatima Catholic School
St. Emily Catholic School

See also
List of high schools in Ontario

References

York Catholic District School Board
Catholic secondary schools in Ontario
High schools in the Regional Municipality of York
Education in Vaughan
Educational institutions established in 2005
2005 establishments in Ontario